The 1920 Volta a Catalunya was the fourth edition of the Volta a Catalunya cycle race and was held from 24 September to 26 September 1920. The race started and finished in Barcelona. The race was won by José Pelletier.

Route and stages

General classification

References

1920
Volta
1920 in Spanish road cycling
September 1920 sports events